Justin Matthew Walker (born 6 September 1975) is an English football coach and former professional footballer who is the joint Assistant Head coach at Hull City.

As a player he was a midfielder who made more than 300 Football League appearances for six different clubs from 1997 to 2006. He notably played for Scunthorpe United and Lincoln City having come through the Nottingham Forest academy. He later played professionally for Exeter City, Cambridge United, York City and Chester City before finishing his career in Non-league football with Ilkeston Town and FC Halifax Town. He has previously had a spell as interim manager of Derby before the appointment of Wayne Rooney.

Playing career
As a youngster, Walker represented England at youth and schoolboy level and signed professional forms with Nottingham Forest in September 1992. But he failed to break into the first-team with Forest and joined Scunthorpe United in March 1997. Walker was a regular with United until he moved to Lincoln City in July 2000, playing in the 1998–99 Football League Division Three play-off final win at Wembley Stadium against Leyton Orient. After two years with Lincoln, in which he was named Player of the Season for the 2000–01 season, financial difficulties due to the ITV Digital collapse meant that Walker was released at the end of his contract.

Walker joined Exeter City in August 2002, but his solitary season with the Grecians ended in relegation from the Football League.

Walker joined Cambridge United in 2003 and suffered relegation in the 2004–05 season. Walker achieved a possibly unique hat-trick of successive relegations out of the league by playing for York City on loan for two months in the 2003–04 season.

Walker joined Chester City ahead of the 2005–06 campaign, where he was to manage just 13 league starts. With six weeks of the season remaining Chester lay bottom of the League Two table and Walker seemed set for yet another relegation experience, but a late run of wins saved City from the drop. However, Walker was released in the summer of 2006 and joined Ilkeston Town.

On 2 August 2008, he linked up with his former Ilkeston manager Nigel Jemson at FC Halifax Town debuting in their inaugural match, a 3–0 home defeat to Bamber Bridge on 16 August 2008. After starting Town's first seven league games, Walker found himself dropped to the substitutes bench and, after one further league appearance from the bench, he was released in November 2008.

Coaching career
On 3 September 2020, after a number of years as part of Derby County's academy staff, Justin was handed the role of Derby County's  first-team development coach in Phillip Cocu's backroom team. In November 2020, he was one of the caretaker management team appointed following the dismissal of Cocu. After Wayne Rooney took sole charge shortly after, Walker returned to his first-team development role.

In November 2022, he joined Hull City as the Assistant Head coach to Liam Rosenior.

References

External links
 

1975 births
Footballers from Nottingham
Living people
English footballers
English Football League players
Association football midfielders
Nottingham Forest F.C. players
Scunthorpe United F.C. players
Lincoln City F.C. players
Exeter City F.C. players
Cambridge United F.C. players
York City F.C. players
Chester City F.C. players
Ilkeston Town F.C. (1945) players
Derby County F.C. managers
Hull City A.F.C. non-playing staff